The 40th Guangdong–Hong Kong Cup was held on 4 and 7 January 2018. Hong Kong won their first title in five years after beating Guangdong in the penalty shoot-out.

Squads

Guangdong
 Head coach: Chen Yuliang
 Assistant coach: Chi Minghua, Yang Pengfeng, Chen Daying, Wu Yaqi

Hong Kong
The final 21-man squad of Hong Kong was announced on 31 December 2017 and was composed of entirely local players.
 Head Coach: Kwok Kar Lok

Match details

First leg

Second leg

References

2017–18 in Hong Kong football
2018
2018 in Chinese football
January 2018 sports events in China